Raja Doraisingam Government Arts College, is a general degree college located in Sivaganga, Tamil Nadu. It was established in the year 1947. The college is affiliated with Alagappa University. This college offers different courses in arts, commerce and science.

Departments

Science
Physics
Chemistry
Mathematics
Botany
Zoology
Computer Science

Arts and Commerce
Tamil
English
History
Economics
Business Administration
Commerce

Accreditation
The college is  recognized by the University Grants Commission (UGC).

References

External links

Educational institutions established in 1947
1947 establishments in India
Colleges affiliated to Alagappa University
Academic institutions formerly affiliated with the University of Madras